Georges Mordant (11 September 1927 – 4 January 1992) was a Belgian footballer. He played in four matches for the Belgium national football team in 1950.

References

External links
 

1927 births
1992 deaths
Belgian footballers
Belgium international footballers
Place of birth missing
Association football midfielders